Ball's Bluff order of battle may refer to:

 Ball's Bluff Confederate order of battle
 Ball's Bluff Union order of battle